The AirClub is a 2012 founded airline alliance of seven airlines. It is considered to be the first and only airline alliance of business airlines, in the world. The alliance has a fleet of over 100 aircraft and is headquartered in Geneva,  Switzerland.

Members 
As of February 2015, the AirClub has the following members:

External links
 Official website

References 

Airline alliances